The Association Sportive Dragon is a handball club in Papeete, Tahiti. They play in the Tahitian Handball League. The club was an offshoot of the football team A.S Dragon Football.

Records

Men
 Oceania Handball Champions Cup
Runners-up - 2007, 2010, 2011

 Tahitian Handball League - 6 titles
Winners - 1991, 1995, 1996, 2000, 2006, 2007

Women
 Oceania Women's Handball Champions Cup - 2 titles
Winners - 2008, 2010
Runners-up - 2009
Third - 2007

 Tahitian Handball League - 11 titles
Winners - 1990, 1992, 1993, 1994, 1995, 1996, 1999, 2000, 2004, 2006, 2007

References

 L'équipe Féminine de Handball du club de l'as Dragon remporte le championnat d'OCEANIE 2010. Tahiti Info's webpage

See also
 Official webpage (French)
 Oceania Continent Handball Federation

Handball clubs
Oceania Handball Clubs
Papeete